Matías Britos Cardoso (born November 26, 1988), commonly known as Matías Britos, is a Uruguayan footballer who plays as a striker, most recently for Peñarol. He also holds Mexican citizenship.

Club career

Al-Hilal
On 12 July 2017, Al-Hilal signed Matías Britos on a two-year contract. He made his debut for as a substitute for Abdullah Otayf in the 67th minute against Al-Fayha. On 21 October 2017, he scored his first goal against Al-Batin in the 62nde minute which gave his side a 2–1 win. He left for Querétaro F.C. in 2018.

Career statistics

International career

Under-22
In 2011, he was named to participate in the Uruguay national football team under-22 squad for the 2011 Pan American Games.

Honours
León
 Liga MX: Apertura 2013, Clausura 2014

Al-Hilal
 AFC Champions League Runners-up : 2017

References

External links

1988 births
Living people
People from San Carlos, Uruguay
Uruguayan footballers
Uruguayan expatriate footballers
Uruguayan Primera División players
Liga MX players
Juventud de Las Piedras players
Rampla Juniors players
Defensor Sporting players
Club León footballers
Club Universidad Nacional footballers
Al Hilal SFC players
Querétaro F.C. footballers
Peñarol players
Expatriate footballers in Mexico
Uruguayan emigrants to Mexico
Footballers at the 2011 Pan American Games
Naturalized citizens of Mexico
Association football forwards
Pan American Games medalists in football
Pan American Games bronze medalists for Uruguay
Uruguayan expatriate sportspeople in Saudi Arabia
Expatriate footballers in Saudi Arabia
Saudi Professional League players
Medalists at the 2011 Pan American Games